This is a list of characters from the manga and anime series Elemental Gelade.

Main characters
Coud Van Giruet
, Naozumi Takahashi (Drama CD)
He is a fifteen-year-old member of the Red Lynx sky pirates who is not allowed to come on raids because he has difficulty flying a plane. Coud has spiky hair and is always seen wearing his red lynx jacket. He aspires to become the new captain of the pirates, and continue to become one of the greatest known sky pirates. Coud was homeless until the age of five when he was found by the boss of the Red Lynx who he since looked up to like father. He takes what boss tells him seriously which is why he feels protecting Ren is so important. Since the Red Lynx sky pirates is a male only ship, Coud never had the chance to interact with females until he met Ren. As a result, he is very shy around her especially when he and Ren are alone together. When he vows to protect her, he also begins to have feelings for her, at first because he thought she was cute and later develops a stronger love for her. Everyone seems to know about his feelings, due to the fact that when they are in Nad Lezen and he admits that he's in love with her, Kuea and Cisqua both roll their eyes and state that they already knew.

Coud finds Reverie Metherlence sleeping in a coffin-like box that was picked up as loot in a raid. He falls in love with her and vows to protect her on her journey to Edel Garden. Ren sees his sincere thoughts and actions and reacts with him so they could protect each other instead of only Coud protecting her. As the story progresses, Coud soon realizes that he is unable to fight efficiently with Ren because he drains too much of her power in every attack. He becomes a formidable fighter after he is taught what an Edel Raid is and what they are capable of doing. Coud's only weapon is a sickle-like tool attached to a long flexible wire called Angel (pronounced "angle") because it's shaped and detachable from the rope like a fish hook. He uses it as a weapon when he is not reacted with Ren or as a means to stop him from falling.It is also hinted that Coud is able to live as long as a Edel Raid because he was killed by the three Edel Raids who wanted to make Ren their new queen, but he was brought back to life when the previous queen of Edel Garden, Eve, gave her life to him so he could be together with Ren. At the anime's end, Cou returns to Red Lynx with Ren as well and are last seen flying off into the moonlit sky on one of the Red Lynx choppers.

A running gag in the show is that Coud is, despite being a sky pirate, is an infamously terrible pilot and frightens the rest of the cast whenever he has to control any sort of mechanized vehicle, including cars, although he is ironically quite handy with tools and mechanics. He improves by the time the anime is over, though he still isn't that good, but he doesn't crash as often.

Reverie "Ren" Metherlence
, Houko Kuwashima (Drama CD)
She is also one of the Seven Glittering Jewels (or Shichiko-hoju) that has not been seen for more than 500 years. She recharges her powers through sleep, which happens to be fairly often. She also dislikes sweet food. Ren has one true desire - to go to Edel Garden.

Ren's Elemental Gelade is slightly above her forehead which she covers with a triangle patterned ribbon that she deems precious (though the ribbon is never spoken of as such in the anime). The ribbon itself was given to Ren by a woman called Sha from her childhood. Sha gave Ren the ribbon to hide her elemental gelade, instead of wearing a hood that made Ren hang her head all the time and look sad. Sha stated that the ribbon was 'cuter' and tied it around Ren's head herself when she first gave it to her. In volume three of the manga, the black market broker describes Ren's elemental gelade (the stone) as jade green but in certain light there are hints of blue. Characters who see it gaze at its beauty in awe, but in envy from some. When Ren reacts, she takes the form of a large blue sword like a "peacock's feather" (in the manga, the color of the sword is the same malachite color as her Elemental Gelade, and appears more organic, as opposed to the anime's more angular blade). Like her description she is light as a feather and can cut even steel with precision and speed like the wind itself, fitting perfectly with her attribute: Wind.

She makes her first appearance after she is found by Cou in a dusty coffin-like box that the Red Lynx sky pirates stole in one of their routine raids. She had been sealed away by a sealing charm for an unknown amount of time (later revealed to be 500 years), but she is unfamiliar with objects in the current world like "flying machines". Ren first loathe humans whom she believes to either uses Edel Raids only as tools or hates them because they can be a destructive force. She quickly realizes what she believed was wrong after she travels with Cou, Cisqua, Rowen, and Kuea who fight to protect her and other Edel Raids from danger. For most of the series, she rarely shows any emotion but does crack a smile from time to time. Eventually, she falls in love with Cou. Her feelings for Cou strengthen over the course of the story, especially in the anime where Cou and Ren's love was able to break the control of the three Edel Raids of Chaos Choir's control of Ren. At the end of the anime, she leaves Edel Garden and joins the Red Lynx sky pirates with Cou and is last seen flying off with Cou, saying that they'll go beyond the stars together.

Cisqua
, Ikue Otani (Drama CD)
 is the energetic and upbeat leader of one of Arc Aile's Edel Raid Complete Protection Association squads consisting of Rowen and Kuea. She is honest and passionate about her work, but only because of her desire to be promoted and her love for money. In the manga, she confesses that she wants money only because her poor family with many brothers and sisters needs it and her older sister had left. In Elemental Gelade ~Flag of Bluesky~, it is revealed that Merfond Librodec is Cisqua's older sister who also shares her drive to make money. Cisqua is modeled from a character the creator drew in middle and high school and B.B. Hood from the Darkstalkers series.

Cisqua is not an Edel Raid pleasure, but she is well versed in martial arts and gunmanship. Despite having a small frame, she is physically strong and capable on taking down well trained pleasures such as the Edel Raid hunter, Wolx Hound. Underneath her robes and hat, she keeps an arsenal of firearms, missiles, knives, and other weapons she uses to complete her missions. Cisqua's gun can be adjusted to become a launcher, shotgun, or machine gun.

In the manga, Cisqua admitted that she once thought of Edel Raids as tools, but she began to think otherwise once she started to hang around Edel Raids like Kuea and Challo. She realizes that Edel Raids are just like her - living beings with emotions. She makes a promise to Ren that she will safely bring her to Edel Garden and once at Edel Garden, Cisqua is allowed to take her into custody. In the anime, Cisqua made a friend with one of the young Edel Raids living in Arc Aile's protection facilities while training to become a guardian. With a strong belief that Edel Raids shouldn't be used as tools, Cisqua refuses to react with her friend and leaves with the memory of her Edel Raid friend crying. She follows Cou and Ren believing that she will figure out the reason why her friend was crying by observing Cou and Ren's relationship.

Cisqua is often worried about the amount of money that her team has got. She even asks the Arc Aile general for a one-month vacation in order to fulfill her promise to Ren. The General denies but then Lieutenant Cruz allows them permission for the vacation due to his kind nature which Cisqua loves. Cisqua seems to fantasize often about Lieutenant Cruz despite their age difference, she also states to Coud at some point in the manga what her dream guy would be like, and she describes Lieutenant Cruz.  Her older sister is Merfond Librodec from Flag of Blue Sky.

Rowen
, Shoutarou Morikubo (Drama CD)
, sometimes called just Ro by his friends, is a guardian of Arc Aile and Kuea's pleasure. He is occasionally tasked to assist with his senior in rank, Cisqua. He is a young blond-haired man that tends to dislike conflict. In contrast to the impulsive and somewhat outrageous Cisqua, Rowen is logical, polite, and considerate of others. His friends believe he is perfect in everything he does, but he realizes there are flaws for trying to perfect everything while training at Arc Aile.

Rowen appears to be the most ordinary member of the group and is skilled in the more practical ability of cooking, which none of the other members of the group appear to be capable of doing. Since they are always low on money, Rowen usually ends up performing odd jobs to make ends meet. He was actually born into a wealthy family living in comfort, but for an unknown reason, he joined Arc Aile. He is seen unused to hard work and the outdoor life like being afraid of bugs.

In the manga, Rowen shows genuine concern and romantic feelings for Viro. These feelings allow Rowen to relate to Greyarts later in the manga when Greyarts tries to take revenge on him for the death of his Edel Raid partner.

Kuea / Kullweet Envatilia
, Akemi Okamura (Drama CD)
Her garnet red elemental gelades are on the back of both her hands which she covers with arm length gloves. Out of the five main characters, Kuea has the most sex appeal who wears revealing clothes, except the creator modeled her character from a male character she once drew in the past. Unlike the other main characters in the anime, besides Cou, Kuea does not change her outfit at one point in the series. When Kuea gets hungry - which seems to be often - she can't React, so she eats enormous amounts of food at a time. It is an ongoing gag that she'll eat anything and anyone and she'd nibbles on Cisqua or Rowen when she is extremely hungry.

Kuea loves to battle and is hasty to fight. When reacted, she increases Rowen's fighting speed. Her weapon form are double blades that Rowen wields on each hand and six chained sickles on his back which can detach and attack opponents from a distance. Rather than slicing, her attacks are designed to pierce.

Minor characters

Beazon is the self-proclaimed lord of El Blanca. He suppresses the villagers by forcing them to pay for his steam power with their own daughters after he blocked the path of the wind blowing their windmill. He then sells the girls to a black market dealer for large sums of money. Beazon kidnaps Ren at night after he is tipped off by a villager who allowed Cou and Ren to rest at his house. He seeks power and only sees Parl as a mere tool to be used. After he discovers Ren to be the Shichiko-Hoju, he battles Cou to attempt to gain more power but he is defeated after Coud discovers the Song, Euros Loop, which decimates his entire manor. It was assumed that Beazon was killed until later volumes reveal that he has survived albeit with grievous injuries. It also seems that he has been driven completely insane and now harbors a pathological fear of all Edel Raids.

In the anime, he is the lord of an unnamed village instead. His only appearance is during the first five episodes of the series. Due to this, he appears to have died after Cou's final battle with him inside of his castle.

Parl is a weak Edel Raid, compared to Kuea and Ren, and Beazon's partner. In the anime, Parl is a Sting Raid instead. When reacting with Beazon, Parl creates a large lion head cannon on his left hand and a giant sword on his other arm. She becomes a Sting Raid because Beazon wanted power and she wanted to be that power to show him her love.  However, Beazon thinks of her as just a tool, completely obsessed with obtaining Ren's power after discovering her. Parl's Elemental Gelade (Sting Raid crest in the anime) is shattered by Cou's attack and she becomes a normal human again.

In the anime, after Beazon's final battle with Cou, she manages to survive and seemingly reforms as she smiles at Cou and Ren as they hurry to escape the crumbling castle. She is later shown bandaging her arm sitting atop the rubble at the episode's end. She later joins the Red Lynx sky pirates towards the end of the anime and seems to be paired with Boss.

In the manga, she reappears later with bandages on her face. The incident at Beazon's manor has also left her mentally unstable and she appears to suffer from an inferiority complex towards Ren(and by extension, all Shichiko-Hoju). She harbors a single-minded vendetta against Cou and Ren and seems obsessed with the notion of defeating them in order to prove that a normal Edel Raid can surpass the power of a Shichiko-Hoju.

, Katsuyuki Konishi (Drama CD)
Wolx Hound is an Edel Raid hunter. He wears a large black coat, has a large scar covering a large portion of his face, and prizes his motorcycle he calls the "Wolx Impulse EV (Wiev)". He shows only a cold demeanor to all except to his Edel Raid, Tilel, but only when they're alone. To others, he claims Edel Raids are just "tools" to be used.

In the anime, Wolx is a high-ranking mercenary hired by Chaos Choir to assists them in capturing Edel Raids. He makes his first appearance searching for an Edel Raid named Selena. After he completes his job, he is assigned to capture Ren, only to find Cou alone.

In the manga, Wolx attacks and badly injures Sunweld and kidnaps Challo. Using a sealing charm, he also kidnaps Kuea. Before completing the deal with a black market broker, he is interrupted by Cisqua.

In both the anime and manga, he admits his defeat after Tilel protects him from a shell fired by Cisqua. After this, he reforms so much that he even helped Coud get to Edel Garden. At the end of the anime, Wolx has now agreed to work with Arc Aile, last seen attacking an unknown enemy while reacting with Tilel.

, Mika Kanai (Drama CD)
Tilel is Wolx Hound's Edel Raid. She appears as a tiny girl with two large red disks in her green hair. Even though Wolx claims she is just a "tool" and he can replace her anytime, she insists that he is the strongest, smartest, and sharpest man alive and becomes jealous when Wolx was inspecting Kuea's gelade. She is fixed on nobly protecting Wolx from harm to her highest extent, and vows to travel together side by side with Wolx, no matter the circumstances.  Tilel has the unique ability to distinguish who is an Edel Raid, helping Wolx with his line of work. In her reacted form, she appears as a giant toy pico-pico hammer. The hammer can disassemble into twelve hovering disks which can block and attack from a distance. She is classified as a djinn defender because she is an Edel Raid of defensive superiority.

In the anime, it is revealed that she lived a life of poverty until she was taken in by Wolx. At the anime's end, she and Wolx are now working for Arc Aile.

, Romi Park (Drama CD)
Rasati is the undefeated champion of the bishop class in the illegal fighting arena Milliard Trey in Razfe Ankul. Ten years ago, the owner of Milliard Trey bought Lillia so she can react with an arena fighter. Rasati vowed to become a fighter in Lillia's place. As a deal with the owner, she fights to earn money to pay for the freedom of Lillia and herself Also to pay back the money that her father owed. Rasati at first fights on her own. She is strong enough to take down even Pleja. After defeating Coud in the arena, she earns enough money to free Lillia, but she is tricked. Lillia reacts with Rasati to finally earn their freedom. In the anime, she later reappears at the final battle, now fighting for Arc Aile while wearing their symbol around her neck, clearing the way for Cou and the others to rescue Ren from Chaos Choir with Wolx at her side. At the anime's end, Rasati is last seen trying on "women's" clothing with Lillia, something she was not very comfortable with since she says they don't suit her.

, Kumi Sakuma (Drama CD)
Lillia is an Edel Raid abandoned and found by Rasati. She was adopted into the Tigres family and lived a happy life until their parents died. Rasati's uncle sold Lillia to a rich man for an undisclosed sum of money because she is an Edel Raid. Ever since , she's been working as a maid in his mansion. She is clumsy and is ridiculed by the other maids but they refrain themselves from bullying her because they're afraid of Rasati. She visits the arena to cheer for Rasati, but she can't stand to see her get hurt.

In the anime, instead of being sold by her uncle, their father died with a large debt. To earn money to pay off the debt, she works as a waitress at a restaurant. She appears once more to help Rasati and those of Arc Aile combat Chaos Choir and help Cou get to Edel Garden. She is now dressed as a nurse with the Arc Aile symbol on her hat. At the anime's end, she's helping Rasati try on women's clothing now that they have no reason to fight anymore. But unlike Lillia, Rasati is uncomfortable in women's clothes despite Lillia saying she was cute.

, Yukari Tamura (Drama CD)
Viro is a young girl with long purple hair and large glasses. She helps Cou and quickly becomes acquainted with the other members of the group. Viro is later revealed to be a spy for the opposing group who has their eyes on Ren, but she's able to travel with the party with little suspicion because of her clumsy and air-headed qualities.

In the anime, Viro also becomes infatuated with Cou and his kind personality and soon becomes hesitant in carrying out her mission.  Viro reacts with Cou to take the form of a large bluish drill-like weapon around his right arm. She sacrifices herself saving Cou from an attack by Gladius. She is often thought of for the rest of the series. Cisqua also looks at a photo of her while writing a letter in the final episode.

In the manga, she turns on the party despite Rowen's attempts to save her. In the end, she turns to dust after her core stone is broken. She states "Viro" isn't her name but a term for all human women with artificial elemental gelades. Her saliva is poison to Edel Raids.

Gladius is an enforcer and punisher of Chaos Choir. In the anime, he is able to materialize a sword, but it is not revealed if the sword is a tiny Edel Raid who hides in his sleeve. He arrives to kill Lonble and battles the group at the Buffalo Festival. With his Darkness Edel Raid, Idwy, and superior skills, he overpowers any attack made by the group. Ren and Cou, with the last vestiges of their strength, manage to throw him off balance with a light attribute attack, which Idwy was vulnerable to, and then finish him with a massive final strike. He escapes, but back at Orga Night Headquarters he is killed by Grayarts and his new light-attribute Edel Raid, which impaled him with multiple energy blades.

Grayarts is an assassin and Cocovet's Edel Raid pleasure. His mission is to kill Cou and capture Ren. However, he only knows their names and the color and shape of Ren after she reacts. This causes a problem because he suspects Kuea and Rowen. Rowen pretends to be Cou to find out what his mission is and manages to defeat him.

In the anime, both he and Cocovet were killed together.

In the manga Grayarts' arms were severed as punishment for failing his mission. He reappears after Gladius is beaten by the group. With arms apparently manifested by his new Edel Raid, he easily killed Gladius, as his new Edel Raid was light-attribute. He wears Cocovet's Elemental Stone as a pendant.

Cocovet is an Edel Raid who reacts with Grayarts. After reacting, she appears as a long curved sword. She is able to amplify Greyart's voice while they are chanting their song and attacks with sonic waves. She is killed after they fail their mission to assassinate Cou. Grayarts wears her Elemental Stone as a pendant.

The Broker
 (Drama CD)
The broker is an antique shop owner, but also a black market dealer involving young girls and Edel Raids. She wears dark robes and a large hat that covers most of her face. In the story she deals with Beazon and Wolx Hound. She owns a pet monkey which sits on her shoulder. She is knowledgeable of Edel Raids and can tell the strength and type of an Edel Raid by looking at the battle form's shape and color.

 (Drama CD)
Alma Gyurty is the broker's attendant and Lailei's pledger. She is tall, has short hair and heterochromatic eyes. She is first seen fighting Cou after he interrupts a transaction between the broker and Wolx.

Lailei is talkative and mischievous and Alma's Edel Raid. Lailei was designed to look like a monkey so her hair is long like a tail and sits on Alma's shoulder. Her gelade is golden and on her ears and her battle form looks like a fan.

 Lonble
 An agent of Orga Night, he has 12 Edel Raids and is knowledgable of their properties. He can even combine them to make different weapons like a fire sword. He's killed along with the 12 by Gladius.

Arc Aile members

General Falk is head of all the guardians of Arc Aile. He has a strict and cold attitude and has a very by-the-books mentality, in contrast with the more lax and progressive Cruz.

Lieutenant Cruz. Second under Falk, he is cheerful and lenient. He tends to think outside the rules and what is actually good for the progression of Arc Aile. Because of this, he allows Cisqua, Rowen, and Kuea to chase after Cou and Ren under the guise of a vacation. He later leads the peace treaty with Chaos Choir at the end of the series, unifying both Guardians and Edel Raids. Cisqua is in love with him.

, Toshihiko Seki (Drama CD)
Sunweld is a member of Arc Aile, Cisqua and Rowen's senior officer, and Challo's pleasure. He has brown hair and a lukewarm personality and look. In the manga, in a fight with Wolx Hound, he sustains a broken leg and a couple of cracked ribs. In the anime, he is beaten by three Sting Raids after he infiltrated Chaos Choir's headquarters.

, Akemi Kanda (Drama CD)
Challo is an Edel Raid and Sunweld's partner. She has pink hair and a green outfit. Her pink gelade is on her right ankle. For an unknown reason, she is very fond of Kuea. In the manga, she is captured by Wolx Hound after she and Sunweld is beaten by him. Challo's reacted form is the shape of rapier.

Myna is a guardian of Arc Aile who excels in sniping. She is also a friend and rival of Cisqua. They trained together before they became guardians of Arc Aile. For an unknown reason she finds Edel Raids revolting. In the anime, the friends reunite on a ship to Volcyone. She poisons Cou and a Sting Raid with a toxin that allows her to control their action with a song. Unfortunately, Cisqua discovers her plan and has to shoot her in order to save Ren.

Flag of Blue Sky characters
Acheaburca Fuajarl
Achea is the princess of Fuajarl, her father was Shinga, the king. She likes horseback riding and sword-fighting and has a pendant with a crystal in it that allows her to communicate with Idola, her only childhood friend no matter the distance and her father's sword. She was exiled after being betrayed by the royals and her father was killed. Now she travels in search of power in order to reclaim her home.

Jelio "Jeen" Velsown
The Edel raid of Shinga and Achea, she is a Shichikou-hoju and her family has been serving the royal family for generations. Shinga's death affected her greatly since the purpose of the attack was to kidnap her, but she hides it by acting cold. Her Gelade is Onyx black and her weapon form is a sword which absorbs sun light, when it moves it looks like a sword dance. She's very skilled with throwing knives.

Merfond Librodec
A woman seeking to open a store in Fuajarl, it was destroyed by the attack. After getting arrested for fighting, she met Achea and helped them escape. In exchange for giving Shinga's sword to Achea, once she reclaims the throne she will build a new store on a first grade piece of land paid for by the royal family. She carries explosives with her similar to Cisqua in the main series and is actually her older sister.

Puffe Runda
A short woman, she's the mechanic for the "Race=Cradle", she was also one of the most trusted people to Shinga and serves as Achea's personal attendant.

Shinga
Achea's father, he was killed by the monarch of Edel garden for refusing to surrender Jeen.

Idola
Achea's Childhood friend and source of strength, he guides her to gain more power.

Anime original characters

 (ep. 1-13) and Lisa Ann Beley (ep. 15-26)
Orfus is one of the three leaders of Chaos Choir, an Edel Raid who harbors hatred for humans. She has short brown hair and glasses. The Edel Raid stone is located in the middle of her chest. She possesses a book written in ancient text which consists of the history and prophecies of Edel Garden as well as the powerful spells she casts. She reacts with Jilltail and Aljeena. Her ultimate plan was to use Ren's power to create a new world where Edel Raids ruled over humans. She was the one who had killed Cou and severed the tie as Pleasure and Edel Raid, unshocked to see him alive after Eve restored Cou's life. Cou and Ren's love awoke the forgotten song sung by humans and Edel Raids, breaking off Orfus and the others' react with Ren. At the anime's end, along with Jilltail and Aljeena, Orfus agrees to join forces with Arc Aile for a brighter future.

Jilltail is one of the leaders of Chaos Choir, she is an Edel Raid. She has long white hair and a dark complexion. Her Edel Raid stone is on her left shoulder. She reacts with Sting Raids to form spider-like legs on her back and attacks with a whip like attack. She reacted with Ren alongside Aljeena and Orfus when Cou's ties with Ren were severed. However, Cou and Ren singing the forgotten song broke the reaction. She joins forces with Arc Aile alongside the others for a brighter future.

Aljeena is one of the leaders of Chaos Choir, she too is an Edel Raid. She wears a red ribbon in her pink hair and embraces a rabbit doll. Despite having a cute appearance, she is cruel to those who anger her. She attacks using Sting Raids as ammo in a cannon attached to her right arm. She reacts with Ren alongside Orfus and Jilltail when Cou's ties are broken. After losing their reaction with Ren by Cou singing the forgotten song with her, Aljeena reforms and joins Orfus and Jilltail in forming a peace with Arc Aile.

Eve is the queen of Edel Garden but solely is used against her will by the members of Chaos Choir. Her appearance is similar to Ren except her gelade is blue. She has the power to create Sting Raids, the sole reason that Orfus and the others used her powers for years. Being on the verge of death, she calls Ren in her dreams to travel to Edel Garden to take her place. Cou follows Ren and Eve learns of how greatly Cou loves Ren. After Orfus uses her reaction with Aljeena and Jilltail to kill Cou, Eve uses the last of her strength to revive Cou, apologizing for everything she had caused by calling to Ren. Even after death, Eve's spirit helped Cou break through to Ren and free her of Chaos Choir's control of her by helping him release the forgotten song.

Selena is an Edel Raid with blond hair and a blue Elemental Gelade on her lower left arm. She once lived at Arc Aile's protection facilities, a place that was said to be filled with happiness, but all she felt was loneliness. She flees the idealistic society and runs off to return to her old village. Her journey home is not a joyful one because Edel Raid hunters like Wolx Hound is on the pursuit to capture her. With the help of Cou and Ren, she safely returns home only to discover her home that she once lived in is occupied by an unknown person and the young children she used to play with has grown very old. To her dismay, she discovers her lover had died a year ago from old age. She blames Arc Aile for her sadness.

References

Elemental Gelade
Characters